Childress High School is a public high school located in Childress, Texas (USA) and classified as a 3A school by the UIL. It is part of the Childress Independent School District located in central Childress County. In 2015, the school was rated "Met Standard" by the Texas Education Agency.

Athletics
The Childress Bobcats compete in the following sports 

Baseball
Basketball
Cross Country
Football
Golf
Powerlifting
Softball
Tennis
Track and Field
Volleyball

State Finalists
Boys Basketball
2023(3A)

References

External links
Childress ISD
Childress Basketball Webpage

Public high schools in Texas